The Indore–Jaipur Express via. Ajmer is a daily express train which runs between Indore Junction railway station of Indore, the largest and commercial capital city of Madhya Pradesh and Jaipur, the capital city of Rajasthan. It previously ran as the Indore–Ajmer Express from Bhopal to Ajmer, a pilgrimage spot in Rajasthan, and prior to that as the Indore–Ratlam Intercity Express.

Number and nomenclature
The number for the train are :

 19711: Indore to Jaipur
 19712: Jaipur to Indore
The train was also known as Ajmeri Link Express which signifies the nearby destination of the train that is Ajmer

Arrival and departure
Train number 19711 departs from Indore Junction daily at 1800 hrs., reaching Jaipur, the next day at 0930 hrs.

Train number 19712 departs from Jaipur daily at 17:25 hrs., reaching Indore Junction, the next day at 10:25 hrs.

Route and Stops
The train goes via Ujjain Junction – Ratlam Junction and Neemuch. The important stops of the train are:
 INDORE JUNCTION
 Indore Sanwer
 Indore Lakshmibai Nagar
 Dewas
 Ujjain Junction
 Khachrod
 Nagda Junction
 Ratlam Junction
 Mandsaur
 Nimach
 Chittorgarh Junction
 Bhilwara
 Nasirabad
 Ajmer Junction
 Kishangarh
 Phulera
 JAIPUR

Coach composite
The train consist a total number of 10 coaches:
 1 AC II
 2 AC III
 5 sleeper
 2 general

Average speed and frequency

Other trains from Indore/ Ujjain to Ajmer
 Kolkata–Ajmer Express
 Hyderabad–Ajmer Express
 Pune–Jaipur Express

Bhopal–Ratlam Intercity Express
The Bhopal–Ratlam Intercity Express was a daily Intercity Express which ran between Bhopal Junction railway station of Bhopal, the capital city of Madhya Pradesh and Ratlam Junction railway station of Ratlam in Western Madhya Pradesh. The train was numbered 9303/9304. The main halts of the train were Bhopal Bairagarh, Shujalpur, Ujjain and Berchha.

In 2009 it was replaced by 9655/9656 Bhopal–Ajmer Express, which was extended in 2011 to Jaipur as the Bhopal–Jaipur Express.

References
 

Rail transport in Madhya Pradesh
Transport in Indore
Transport in Jaipur
Rail transport in Rajasthan
Express trains in India